General Henry Dundas, 3rd Viscount Melville GCB (25 February 1801 – 1 February 1876) was a senior British Army officer and peer.

Military career 
The eldest son of Robert Dundas, 2nd Viscount Melville, and his wife Anne, Dundas joined the Army as a lieutenant in the 3rd (or Scots) Guards in 1819. He was promoted to captain of the 83rd Regiment in 1824, major in 1826 and lieutenant-colonel in 1829. In 1837 he was active in suppressing the Canadian rebellion at the Battle of the Windmill, after which he was appointed colonel and aide-de-camp to Queen Victoria in 1841.

He played a distinguished part in India as a brigadier-general in 1848–49, chosen to command the column sent from Bombay to co-operate with Lord Gough's army in the Second Anglo-Sikh War. He was second in command at the capture of Multan and then joined the main army with his force for the battle of Gujrat.

He returned to England in 1850 and became 3rd Viscount Melville on his father's death in 1851. He became Commander-in-Chief, Scotland in 1854 remaining in that post until 1860, in which year he was made Governor of Edinburgh Castle. He was raised to the rank of general in 1868.

He died unmarried at Melville Castle, near Edinburgh in 1876. He is buried in the simple Dundas Vault in Old Lasswade Kirkyard, together with his ancestors and descendants.

His younger brother, Richard Saunders Dundas, was a prominent naval officer.

He was succeeded as Viscount Melville by his brother Robert.

Parliament 
He was a Member of Parliament (MP) for Rochester from 1826 to 1830, and for Winchelsea from 1830 to 1831.

Arms

Street names
The re-routed and extended Dundas Street West and East, in the City of Toronto, is named after him.

References

External links

|-

|-

|-

|-

1801 births
1876 deaths
British military personnel of the Second Anglo-Sikh War
Viscounts in the Peerage of the United Kingdom
British Army generals
Upper Canada Rebellion people
Henry Dundas
King's Royal Rifle Corps officers
Coldstream Guards officers
83rd (County of Dublin) Regiment of Foot officers
Members of the Parliament of the United Kingdom for English constituencies
Knights Grand Cross of the Order of the Bath
UK MPs 1826–1830
UK MPs 1830–1831
UK MPs who inherited peerages